Harry Plummer may refer to:
 Harry Plummer (Australian footballer)
 Harry Plummer (rugby union)

See also
 Henry Plummer (disambiguation)
 Harold Plummer, English footballer